Mining geology is an applied science which combines the principles of economic geology and mining engineering to the development of a defined mineral resource. Mining geologists and engineers work to develop an identified ore deposit to economically extract the ore.
Mining geology is the process of exploration and exploitation of ore or economic minerals from the earth.it is also called "winning"the ore from the earth.

See also
 Ore genesis
 Prospecting
 Mineral exploration
 Exploration geophysics
 Geochemistry
 Remote sensing
 Mining
 Industrial mineral

References

 

Economic geology
Mining